The Borgward Hansa 2400 was an executive six-cylinder saloon (E-segment) presented in 1951, and manufactured by the Bremen based auto-manufacturer Carl F. W. Borgward GmbH from 1952 until 1959. The car was launched as a four-door fastback saloon; a longer-wheelbase notchback version appeared a year later. The Hansa 2400 suffered from teething troubles including inadequate brakes and problems with the automatic transmission Borgward developed for it. In a small closely contested market, the large Borgwards lost out to less flamboyant models from the German south.

Chronology and design
The Hansa 2400 commenced production in 1952 as a large fastback saloon, its profile reminiscent of the recently introduced Hudson Super Wasp. It had presence. Unusually at this time, all four doors were forward opening to presumably facilitate access and egress. The body was an all-steel integral structure, similar to on the car's four-cylinder sibling.

Sales material emphasized the car's luxury features, such as a heating and ventilation system ducting air direct to rear passengers as well as to the front, with each system and side separately adjustable. Luxury details such as the cigarette lighter, self-parking windshield wipers, and side windows lowering completely into the doors barely-merited a mention. The spare wheel was stowed flat in a compartment beneath the boot, accessible through a hatch behind a section of the rear bumper so a wheel change could be accomplished without the need to empty the luggage.

New shape
A year later a longer-wheelbase notchback limousine version appeared. Options included a partition to enable the car to be used for traditional chauffeur operations.

In 1955, production of the fastback saloon ceased. The long-wheelbase car underwent a minor facelift involving prominent headlamp surrounds. It was produced through 1959.

Power
According to rumors, the vehicle was intended for the anemic four-cylinder 1758 cc engine. That engine went into an uprated version of the Hansa 1500.

Power was delivered to the rear wheels via a four-speed manual gearbox with synchromesh on all ratios. An automatic gear change option was also advertised, making the car, according to some sources, the first German car to be offered with automatic transmission.

References
This entry is based on information from the German Wikipedia Borgward article.

Hansa 2400
Cars introduced in 1952
Rear-wheel-drive vehicles
Executive cars
Sedans
Limousines